Healy River Airport  is a state owned, public use airport serving Healy, a community located in the Denali Borough of the U.S. state of Alaska. It is included in the National Plan of Integrated Airport Systems for 2011–2015, which categorized it as a general aviation facility.

Facilities and aircraft 
Healy River Airport covers an area of 1,294 acres (524 ha) at an elevation of 1,263 feet (385 m) above mean sea level. It has one runway designated 15/33 with an asphalt surface measuring 2,912 by 60 feet (888 x 18 m).

For the 12-month period ending December 31, 2005, the airport had 1,300 aircraft operations, an average of 108 per month: 61.5% general aviation and 38.5% air taxi. At that time there were 7 aircraft based at this airport: 85% single-engine and 14% multi-engine.

Airlines and destinations

See also 
 Healy Lake Airport in Healy Lake, Alaska (Southeast Fairbanks Census Area) at coordinates

References

External links 

 Topographic map as of July 1976 from USGS The National Map

Airports in Denali Borough, Alaska